Vozmaleh or Vezmeleh or Vezmaleh may refer to:
 Vozmaleh, Miyan Darband, Kermanshah Province
 Vozmaleh, Poshtdarband, Kermanshah Province
 Vezmeleh, Baneh, Kurdistan Province
 Vezmeleh, Saqqez, Kurdistan Province